NBA 2K1 is a 2000 sports video game developed by Visual Concepts and published by Sega. It was the first NBA 2K game to feature online multiplayer and the first game to feature street courses instead of playing a game inside the arena in the first game, famous street courts such as The Cage, Rucker Park, Franklin Park, and Goat Park.

Gameplay
New features were added to NBA 2K1. This includes the new Association, General Manager, and Street modes. The game features rosters from the 2000–01 NBA season.

Cover
The cover athlete was featured as Allen Iverson of the Philadelphia 76ers until the release of ESPN NBA 2K5.

Reception

The game received "universal acclaim" according to video game review aggregator Metacritic. Rob Smolka of NextGen said that the game was "Highly recommended, but frankly, we were expecting a lot more based on the improvement of NFL 2K1 over NFL 2K." In Japan, where the game was ported for release on March 29, 2001, Famitsu gave it 30 out of 40.

The game was a runner-up for GameSpots annual "Best Multiplayer Game" and "Best Sports Game (Traditional)" awards among console games, which went to Quake III Arena and NFL 2K1, respectively.

Game Informer ranked it at 95 on its top 100 video games of all-time list. The staff praised the developers for maintaining the quality gameplay of its predecessor while adding online, new settings, and a Franchise mode.

References

External links
 

2000 video games
Dreamcast games
Dreamcast-only games
Multiplayer and single-player video games
1
Sega video games
Video games developed in the United States
Video games set in 2000
Video games set in 2001